William Noye may refer to:

 William Noy (1577–1634), British jurist
 William Noye (entomologist) (1814–1872), amateur entomologist